Nguyễn Huy Hoàng (born 10 July 2000) is a Vietnamese swimmer. He competed at the 2018 Asian Games, winning silver in the men's 1500 metre freestyle and bronze in the men's 800 metre freestyle. He competed in the Men's 800 metre freestyle and Men's 1500 metre freestyle at the 2020 Summer Olympics.

Personal best

References

External links
 

 

2000 births
Living people
People from Quảng Bình province
Vietnamese male freestyle swimmers
Asian Games medalists in swimming
Asian Games silver medalists for Vietnam
Asian Games bronze medalists for Vietnam
Swimmers at the 2018 Asian Games
Medalists at the 2018 Asian Games
Swimmers at the 2018 Summer Youth Olympics
Competitors at the 2019 Southeast Asian Games
Southeast Asian Games gold medalists for Vietnam
Southeast Asian Games silver medalists for Vietnam
Southeast Asian Games medalists in swimming
Youth Olympic gold medalists for Vietnam
Swimmers at the 2020 Summer Olympics
Olympic swimmers of Vietnam
Competitors at the 2021 Southeast Asian Games
21st-century Vietnamese people